Choqa Kalbali (also Romanized as Choqā Kalb‘alī and Chaqā Kalbe‘alī) is a village in Mahidasht Rural District, Mahidasht District, Kermanshah County, Kermanshah Province, Iran. At the 2006 census, its population was 339, in 70 families.

References 

Populated places in Kermanshah County